Eduardo Soares Ferreira (born October 8, 1983) is a footballer who plays as a centre back. Born in Brazil, he represented the Equatorial Guinea national team.

Club career
After a stint with South African club Mamelodi Sundowns, Ferreira signed for Colombian second tier club America Cali in January 2012. He injured himself in a match against Atlético Bucaramanga in May. In July 2013, he returned to the South African top tier with newly promoted club Black Aces after a stint with Thai club Ratchaburi.

In 2015, Ferreira signed for Iranian club Esteghlal Khuzestan from Brazilian club Macaé. In the only season he spent with the club, he won the Iran Professional League title with it. At the end of the season, he was told by the club that he was surplus to its requirements and he was free to leave the club in the summer. Subsequently, he moved to the Indian Super League and signed for Pune City for the 2016 season. In November, he scored his first goal for the club in a match against Atlético Kolkata.

On 6 December 2016, after the end of the Super League, Ferreira joined I-League club Mohun Bagan. In the following October, he switched to city rivals East Bengal as a replacement for the injured Carlyle Mitchell. He scored his first goal on 28 November, in a 2–2 draw against Aizawl FC.

In August 2018 he joined NEROCA FC.

International career
Ferreira was naturalized in 2013 and made his international debut for Equatorial Guinea on 16 November 2013 against Spain as an 81st-minute substitute for Viera Ellong.

References

External links

Eduardo at Footballdatabase

1983 births
Living people
Footballers from Rio de Janeiro (city)
Equatoguinean footballers
Equatorial Guinea international footballers
Brazilian footballers
Association football defenders
Eduardo Ferreira
Brazilian expatriates in South Africa
Brazilian expatriates in Colombia
Brazilian expatriate sportspeople in India
Associação Atlética Anapolina players
Cape Town Spurs F.C. players
Mamelodi Sundowns F.C. players
Clube de Regatas Brasil players
América de Cali footballers
Mpumalanga Black Aces F.C. players
Macaé Esporte Futebol Clube players
Esteghlal Khuzestan F.C. players
FC Pune City players
Mohun Bagan AC players
East Bengal Club players
NEROCA FC players
South African Premier Division players
Categoría Primera B players
Persian Gulf Pro League players
I-League players
Equatoguinean people of Brazilian descent
Equatoguinean expatriate footballers
Naturalized citizens of Equatorial Guinea
Equatoguinean expatriate sportspeople in India
Calcutta Football League players